Europos Parkas
Gediminas Tower
Geographical Center of Europe
Grūtas Park
Hill of Crosses
Palanga Amber Museum
Rambynas
Stelmužė Oak
Three Crosses
Trakai Island Castle
Trakai Peninsula Castle

See also
Castles in Lithuania
Tourism in Lithuania
 

 
Landmarks
Lithuania